Russia competed at the 2013 World Aquatics Championships in Barcelona, Spain between 19 July and 4 August 2013.

Medalists

Diving

Russia has qualified the following divers:

Men

Women

High diving

Russia has qualified a single athlete in high diving.

Open water swimming

Russia has qualified the following swimmers in open water marathon.

Men

Women

Mixed

Swimming

Russian swimmers earned qualifying standards in the following events (up to a maximum of 2 swimmers in each event at the A-standard entry time, and 1 at the B-standard):

Men

Women

Synchronized swimming

Russia has qualified twelve synchronized swimmers.

Water polo

Women's tournament

Team roster

Anna Ustyukhina
Diana Antonova
Ekaterina Prokofyeva
Elvina Karimova
Alexandra Antonova
Olga Belova
Ekaterina Tankeeva
Anna Grineva
Anna Timofeeva
Olga Beliaeva
Evgeniya Ivanova
Ekaterina Zelentsova
Anna Karnaukh

Group play

Round of 16

Quarterfinal

Semifinal

Third place game

References

External links
Barcelona 2013 Official Site

Nations at the 2013 World Aquatics Championships
2013 in Russian sport
Russia at the World Aquatics Championships